Superintendent Micky Rosenfeld is the Israel Police National Spokesman to the foreign Media. He was appointed to this position as an Inspector in 2005 after serving for eight years as a combat officer in the Yamam counter-terrorism unit. Rosenfeld specialized in operations & Intelligence, trained CT units in techniques & strategies to prevent & respond to terrorist attacks  By 2008 he had been promoted to the rank of Chief Inspector. Rosenfeld is responsible for coverage of all major terrorist attacks & events across the country & corresponds to hundreds of media agencies worldwide. Rosenfeld represents the INP, Israel National Police on a National level to all foreign delegations, law enforcement agencies, Homeland Security & VIPs from US & Europe. He was promoted to the rank of Superintendent in 2012.

References

Living people
Year of birth missing (living people)